John Bell (1783–1864) was a printer and avid collector of ballads who played a major part in the recording of the lyrics of popular songs in the north east of England.

Life and death 
Bell was born in 1783, it is thought in Newcastle, and was a printer, sometime surveyor, collector (or probably more correctly, an obsessive hoarder) of anything and everything, but particularly to do with the music that was popular at the time.

Bell followed the precedent set by Joseph Ritson, an eminent and eccentric scholar from Stockton, was probably one of (if not the) first to set down some of the local dialect songs popular in the day. He published a series of “Northern Garlands” in 1793 which contained among others “The Collier's Rant”, “The Keel Row”, “Bobby Shaftoe” and “Elsie Marle.” Bell followed close behind, but adopted a more organised and professional approach.

His many sources ranged from the rich and famous down to the characters of the Newcastle Quayside. His book “Rhymes of Northern Bards” was  published in 1812. It included “Bobby Shaftoe”, “Buy Broom Besoms”, “Water of Tyne”, “Dollia”, but with very few mining themed songs except “The Collier's Pay Week", ”Footy Agin the Wall” and “Byker Hill”. There appears to be no logic or method behind the selection of the lyrics, except that they were all local dialect, as it covers a wide range of topics including politics, history, crimes, local characters, work and pleasure. Bell had added notes which two hundred years later are historically very interesting and important.

Bell died in 1864.

Rhymes of Northern Bards 
The front cover of the book was as thus :-

Rhymes
Of
Northern Bards: 
being a curious
Collection
of old and new
Songs And Poems, 
Peculiar to the Counties of 
Newcastle upon Tyne, 
Northumberland, & Durham.

Edited by John Bell, Jun.

“Northumbria’s sons stand forth, by all confest
“The first and firmest of fair freedom’s train; 
“Each brave Northumbrian Nurses in his breast
“The sacred spoark, unsullied by a stain.”

Newcastle upon Tyne: (printed in an old English style) 
Printed for John Bell, by M. Angus & Son, and sold by them,  
and other Booksellers in Town.

MDCCCXII

Legacy 
John Bell's part in local history is secure due to the vast amount of material from  books, broadsheets, chap books and notated songs he published. His company eventually went bankrupt in 1856 and the collection was split, although many items went to another collector, Robert White, and some have ended up in the collection of Newcastle University.

In 1813, acting on an idea put forward by Bell, the Newcastle Society of Antiquaries was founded. It held its first meeting at the Turks's Head, believed to have been located in the large listed building in Grey Street.

See also 
Geordie dialect words
Rhymes of Northern Bards

References

External links
 John Bell’s 1812 Rhymes of Northern Bards
 Farne Folk Archives
 Time line
 Front cover of “Rhymes of Northern Bards”

English music publishers (people)
English antiquarians
People from Newcastle upon Tyne (district)
1783 births
1864 deaths
Geordie songwriters
19th-century English musicians
19th-century British businesspeople